Alvalade is a station on the Green Line of the Lisbon Metro. The station is located under Av. de Roma, at the intersection with  Av. da Igreja in the Alvalade neighbourhood.

History
The original 1972 design of the station was by the architect Denis Gomes with art work by Maria Keil. On 17 August 2006 the south lobby was opened based on a renovation project designed by the architect  Sanchez Jorge with art installations by Bela Silva; the remodeled north lobby would be completed on 25 October 2007, this time with assistance from the original artist Maria Keil. The station was also equipped to be able to serve passengers with physical disabilities; lifts provide access to the platforms.

Connections

Urban buses

Carris 
 206 Cais do Sodré ⇄ Senhor Roubado (Metro) (morning service)
 735 Cais do Sodré ⇄ Hospital Santa Maria
 755 Poço do Bispo ⇄ Sete Rios
 767 Campo Mártires da Pátria ⇄ Reboleira (Metro)

See also
 List of Lisbon metro stations

References

External links

Green Line (Lisbon Metro) stations
Railway stations opened in 1972